This is a list of the monastic houses in County Cork, Ireland.

Notes

References

See also
List of monastic houses in Ireland

Cork
Monastic houses
Monastic houses
Monastic houses